Dudley Klute (born December 10) is an American vocalist and songwriter noted for his work with the Belgian New Wave band Kid Montana in the 1980s, and his subsequent collaborations with Stephin Merritt's The Magnetic Fields (he was a guest singer on 69 Love Songs), LD Beghtol, and other musicians. Additionally, he was one-third of the live-only performance ensemble The Three Terrors along with Merritt and Beghtol. Klute lives in Manhattan.

References

External links 
 Kid Montana shrine
 Article about rerelease of Kid Montana's Temperamental
 Three Terrors New York extravaganza fan page
 69LS review

Living people
Year of birth missing (living people)
American male singer-songwriters
Musicians from Boston
People from Manhattan
Singer-songwriters from New York (state)
Singer-songwriters from Massachusetts